RK Tutunski Kombinat (HC Tutunski Kombinat) was a team handball club from Prilep, Republic of Macedonia, present-day North Macedonia. The team won the 2002 Macedonian Handball Cup and had represented Macedonia in the EHF Challenge Cup and EHF Cup Winners' Cup.

Accomplishments
 Macedonian Handball Cup 
Winners (1): 2002

References

External links 
 Tribute Website 

Tutunski
Defunct handball clubs
Sport in Prilep